Devil Water is a 1962 historical fiction novel by Anya Seton.

A 2007 edition features a foreword by Philippa Gregory.

Plot 
Charles Radcliffe escapes from Newgate Prison after his brother's execution during the Jacobite rising of 1715. Charles' daughter Jenny travels across the Atlantic Ocean to Williamsburg, Virginia and William Byrd's plantation.

Reception 
Robert Scholes in The New York Times Book Review wrote, "The author has missed, or perhaps deliberately avoided, opportunities for really exciting scenes[...] "When Miss Seton merely fictionalizes history, relying on the actual diaries of William Byrd of Virginia, or quoting verbatim letters of Byrd and the Earls of Derwentwater, she manages well. The embarrassing moments in the narrative come from her piecing out of the gaps inconveniently left by history."

Fanny Butcher wrote "mixed by Miss Seton's skillful hands, the dust of the past becomes the clay of the artist and is molded into memorable, lifelike form."

It was also reviewed by Kirkus Reviews.

Devil Water reached #5 on The New York Times Best Seller list.

References 

Novels by Anya Seton
1962 novels
American historical novels